Nuhu Bamalli Polytechnic is a tertiary education institution in Zaria Kaduna State, Nigeria. The polytechnic was established on 2 February 1989 by the Kaduna state government to provide training and development techniques in the Field of engineering, applied science, commerce and other spheres of learning. The polytechnic is one of the tertiary teaching institutions owned and managed by the Kaduna State government. The polytechnic was named after the then Nigeria's foreign minister Nuhu Bamalli. In August 2022, Barrister Abdullahi Zubair Abdullahi was appointed the new Registrar of the polytechnic.

History
The school was established in February 1989, during the administration of Colonel Dangiwa Umar. The polytechnic was established to provide training and development of techniques in Applied Sciences, Engineering and Commerce, as well as other spheres of learning.
The current Governing Council of the polytechnic as constituted by Governor Nasir E-Rufai in December, 2021. Chairman of the council is Ishaya Dare Akawu, with Haruna Uwais, Gladys Goje and Salisu Garba Kubau. Other members include the Rector, the permanent secretaries of the ministries of Health and Finance, a member of the Academic Board, and representatives of the Nigerian Association of Engineers, Ahmadu Bello University and Ministry of Justice.

Schools and Campuses
The main campus of the polytechnic is located in the old UPE, along Kaduna-Zaria road with additional campuses at Tudun wada Gaskiya, and Samaru Kataf, in Zangon Kataf local Government Area of Kaduna State. The schools are:

Main Campus
 School of Applied Sciences
 School of Engineering
 School of Environmental 
 School of Liberal Studies
 School of Vocational and Technical Education

Tudun Wada Campus
 School of Management Studies
 School of Advance and Preliminary Studies.

Samarun Kataf Campus
 School of Agricultural Technology

Bandit attack
On 15th November 2020, bandits attacked the main campus of the polytechnic. The staff and students kidnapped by the bandits were released in July 2021, after a ransom had been paid.

References

External links
 Official Website Nuhu Bamalli Polytechnic

1989 establishments in Nigeria
Educational institutions established in 1989
Zaria